Jaya Maswood (born 1 July), commonly known as Jaya Ahsan, is a Bangladeshi actress and producer. Starting her career as a model and, later, as a television actress, she currently works mostly in Bangladeshi and Indian Bengali films. She won Bangladesh National Film Award for Best Actress five times for her performances in the films Guerrilla (2011), Chorabali (2012), Zero Degree (2015), Debi (2018) and Alatchakra (2021). At the Madrid International Film Festival 2020, she won Filmfare Awards Bangla in 2017, 2021 & 2022 and Zee Cine awards in 2018.

Early life 
Ahsan was born to A. S. Maswood (d. 2012) and Rehana Maswood in Dhaka, Bangladesh. She has a younger sister and brother. Along with her formal education, she took a diploma course in Rabindra Sangeet and training in classical music. She first appeared on television when she performed in the teledrama Panchami. She modeled for a calendar which caught the eye of Afzal Hossain, who later offered her work on a promotional advertisement for the soft drink Coca-Cola. Afterwards, she left modeling and continued with her studies. She joined the newspaper Bhorer Kagoj, a national daily. After a brief stint at a children's school, she returned to modelling. Thereafter, she worked in Giasuddin Selim's Shongshoy. She also practices crafting and painting, which she demonstrated in art house productions like Enechhi Shurjer Hashi.

Career

Television
Ahsan first appeared on television in an ad for Coca-Cola in 1997. She debuted her acting career on television through the drama Panchomi, written by Shahidul Haque Khan.

Having begun her career as a model in the late 1990s, Ahsan has since worked in numerous television dramas and serials. She established her reputation as an actress with roles as Monika in Labonyo Probha, Pushpo in Toukir Ahmed and Bipasha Hayat's teleplay Shonkhobash, and in Hatkura. She found Hatkura, set on the edge of a village in Rangpur District, a challenge. "I had to learn the dialect of Rangpur for the role. Actually, I had never been to a village before that. And it was a completely new experience for me", she said. In Channel i's 2010–2011 serial Choita Pagol, she played the role of rural woman Alta. Ahsan said, "Alta is one of my favourite characters. I liked playing the role." Her performance in Mejbaur Rahman Sumon's Tarporo Angurlata Nondoke Bhalobashe also cemented her position as an actress. She portrayed various characters in teledramas including: Sixty Nine (69), Tevaga, Shahortolir Alo, Tarpor Paruler Deen, Amader Choto Nodi, Mayesha, Jostna, Nodi Othoba Roshider Kichu Kolpo Drisyo, Amader Golpo and many more.

Ahsan played the role of a sex worker in the television play Tarporo Angurlata Nando Ke Bhalobashey in 2009.

Film

Ahsan debuted her film career as a guest artiste in the film Bachelor (2004), directed by Mostofa Sarwar Farooki. As the lead actress, she debuted in Nasiruddin Yousuff's film Guerrilla (2011)). Adapted from the novel Nishiddho Loban by Syed Shamsul Huq, the film was based on the events of the Bangladesh Liberation War. It narrates the tale of Bilkis Banu, played by Ahsan, a freedom fighter, who actively participates in the Liberation War while searching for her lost husband. The film won National Film Awards in ten categories, including the Best Actress Award for Ahsan.

Ahsan's second film, Chorabali (2012), was an action thriller directed by Redoan Rony. She portrayed Noboni Afroz, a journalist, and won her second National Film Award for Best Actress Award.

In 2013, Ahsan acted in an Indian Bangla film titled Aborto, directed by Arindam Sil. She was nominated for the Filmfare Awards East for Best Debut Performance Female for her role in the film. She also received an official invitation to attend the 66th Cannes Film Festival. In the same year, she appeared in Purno Doirgho Prem Kahini, a Bangladeshi romantic film directed by Shafi Uddin Shafi. It was her first Bangladeshi film in collaboration with Shakib Khan. They both starred in its sequel, Purno Doirgho Prem Kahini 2, released in 2015.

After a one-year break Zero Degree was her next venture. The film is a psychological thriller written and directed by Animesh Aich and was released on 15 January 2015. Ahsan won a National Film Award for best actress for her performance in the film. In 2015, Ahsan worked in two other Indian Bangla films — Rajkahini based on the 1947 east and west Bengal separation directed by Srijit Mukherji and Ekti Bangali Bhuter Goppo, a psycho-horror film directed by Indranil Roychowdhury. Ekti Bangali Bhuter Golpo was set for a world TV premier in Kolkata on 17 May in Zee Bangla Cinema. Jaya's much anticipated Rajkahini starring alongside Rituparna Sengupta, Abir Chatterjee, Parno Mittra, Sohini Sarkar, Rajatava Dutta and many others was released on 16 October 2015.

In 2017, Ahsan acted in Bishorjan alongside Abir Chatterjee and Kaushik Ganguly directed by Kaushik Ganguly himself, for which she received awards including Filmfare Awards (first Bangladeshi to win so), Zee Cine Awards and BFJA Awards for her performance portraying the character of Padma. In the same year, Jaya was honoured with the ABP Ananda Sera Bangali for achievement in acting. Her other two releases that year are Akram Khan's Khacha: The Cage and Manoj Michigan's Ami Joy Chatterjee.

In 2018, Ahsan performed in a courtroom drama Ek Je Chhilo Raja based on the historic Bhawal case directed by Srijit Mukjerji in a star cast including Jisshu Sengupta, Aparna Sen, Anjan Dutt, Rudranil Ghosh and others. She was also seen in Crisscross alongside Mimi Chakraborty and Nusrat Jahan, directed by Birsa Dasgupta. Debi, a film based on Humayun Ahmed's novel, was released on 19 October 2018. It is directed by Anam Biswas, starring Chanchal Chowdhury, Ahsan and Sabnam Faria in the lead roles. The film was produced by Ahsan, as her first production from her production house C Te Cinema. She received her fourth National Film Award for Best Actress and her seventh Meril Prothom Alo Award for Best Film Actress (Critics Choice) for her performance in this film.

In 2019, her first release was Kaushik Ganguly's Bijoya, sequel to Bishorjan for which she won the Tele Cine Awards for Best Actress and Best Jodi alongside her co-star Abir Chatterjee. Then she was seen in Arnab Paul's debut Brishty Tomakey Dilam, a psychological thriller based on split personality disorder. She received the 'Dashobhuja Bangali 2019' award from the St. Xavier's College Calcutta Alumni Association. Next she did Konttho which released on 10 May directed by Nandita Roy and Shiboprosad Mukherjee starring Shiboprosad Mukherjee himself, Paoli Dam where Jaya plays the role of a speech therapist. After that she teamed up with Atanu Ghosh for his upcoming movie Bini Sutoy alongside Ritwick Chakraborty where she will also do a playback. Jaya again worked with Atanu Ghosh next film titled Robibar starring with Prosenjit Chatterjee for the first time. She has finished Soukarya Ghosal's fantasy horror Bhoot Pori and is shooting for Kaushik Ganguly's next titled Ardhangini starring alongside Churni Ganguly. She wrapped up filming Alatchakra, the first 3D Bengali movie directed by  Habibur Rahman based on the novel by Ahmed Sofa. She recently worked with Piplu Khan on his first feature film based on the current pandemic.

Playback
Ahsan is also a singer and took diploma courses in Indian classical music and Rabindra Sangeet. She did playback in few films, such as "Tomer Khola Hawa" in Dubshatar and "Jongoler Daak" in Mesidona.

Other activities
Ahsan is a craftswoman and a visual-artist, which she demonstrated in art-house movie productions like Enechhi Shurjer Hashi. She was chosen as a brand ambassador for USAID (US Agency for International Development) to help women and children. In 2019, Ahsan was chosen as the brand ambassador of Bangamata U-19 Women's International Gold Cup.

Personal life
Ahsan married Faisal, a television model, on 14 May 1998. The couple was also seen in same television ad. Together they ran an event management company. She divorced Faisal in 2012.

Works

Films

Television

Series

Telefilms

Web series
 Paanch Phoron

Awards and nominations

National Film Awards

Meril Prothom Alo Awards

 Bachsas Awards 

Filmfare Awards East

Bengal Film Journalists' Association Awards

Zee Cine Awards

Tele Cine Awards

International Bangla Film Critic Award 

 ABP Ananda Sera Bangali Award

Dhaka International Film Festival 

 Lux Channel i Performance Award 

 CJFB Performance Award 

 Charuniram Award

Notes

References

External links

Living people
People from Dhaka
Bangladeshi film actresses
Bangladeshi television actresses
Best Actress National Film Awards (Bangladesh) winners
Best Actress Bachsas Award winners
Best Film Actress Meril-Prothom Alo Award winners
Best TV Actress Meril-Prothom Alo Award winners
Best TV Actress Meril-Prothom Alo Critics Choice Award winners
Actresses in Bengali cinema
Bengali television actresses
Bangladeshi expatriate actresses in India
21st-century Bangladeshi actresses
Year of birth missing (living people)